Charles Frank Mangione (born November 29, 1940) is an American flugelhorn player, trumpeter and composer.

He came to prominence as a member of Art Blakey's band in the 1960s, and later co-led the Jazz Brothers with his brother, Gap. He achieved international success in 1977 with his jazz-pop single "Feels So Good". Mangione has released more than 30 albums since 1960.

Early life and career
Mangione was born and raised in Rochester, New York, United States. With his pianist brother Gap, they led the Mangione Brothers Sextet/Quintet, which recorded three albums for Riverside Records, before Mangione branched out into other work. He attended the Eastman School of Music from 1958 to 1963, then joined Art Blakey's Jazz Messengers, for which he filled the trumpet chair previously held by Clifford Brown, Freddie Hubbard, Kenny Dorham, Bill Hardman, and Lee Morgan.

In the late 1960s, Mangione was a member of the band The National Gallery, which in 1968 released the album Performing Musical Interpretations of the Paintings of Paul Klee. Mangione served as director of the Eastman jazz ensemble from 1968 to 1972. In 1970, he returned to recording with the album Friends and Love, recorded in concert with the Rochester Philharmonic Orchestra and guest performers.

Mangione's quartet with saxophonist Gerry Niewood was a popular concert and recording act throughout the 1970s. "Bellavia", recorded during this collaboration, won Mangione his first Grammy Award in 1977 in the category Best Instrumental Composition.

Mangione's composition "Chase the Clouds Away" was used at the 1976 Summer Olympics in Montreal, Quebec. His composition "Give It All You Got" was the theme to the 1980 Winter Olympic Games in Lake Placid, New York. He performed it live on a global television broadcast at the closing ceremonies. In 1978, Mangione composed the soundtrack for the film The Children of Sanchez starring Anthony Quinn. This album won him his second Grammy, in the category Best Pop Instrumental performance in 1979. The title song's full version was almost 15 minutes long and featured a wind section theme. In 1981, Mangione composed and performed the theme for the film The Cannonball Run.

In addition to his quartet with Niewood, Mangione had much success with his later-1970s ensemble, with Chris Vadala on saxophones and flutes, Grant Geissman on guitars, Charles Meeks on bass guitar, and James Bradley Jr. on drums. This version of Mangione's band recorded and toured behind the hit studio albums Feels So Good and Fun and Games and the Children of Sanchez soundtrack. Some band members participated in the "Tarantella" benefit concert in 1980.

The band was also featured with a 70-piece orchestra on the live album An Evening of Magic, which was recorded at the Hollywood Bowl on July 16, 1978, at the height of Mangione's success from "Feels So Good". Performances of material new and old included versions of "Main Squeeze", "Hill Where the Lord Hides", and "Chase the Clouds Away". Mangione opened and closed the show with "Feels So Good" and its "Reprise" version. "B' Bye" featured a string arrangement from Bill Reichenbach. The horns were arranged by frequent collaborator Jeff Tyzik, who also played trumpet in the horn section that night. Mangione played material from the just-released "Children of Sanchez" soundtrack album, which made its West Coast concert debut.

The liner notes from the album describe the frenzy in which the performance was put together. Unable to set up on stage the day before (The Los Angeles Philharmonic played the "1812 Overture" on July 15), Mangione and his crew had only the day of show to set up lights, sound and recording gear. He had only nine hours the day before to rehearse at A&M studios with the orchestra's musicians and was never able to run through the entire set list once in its entirety. He and the band stayed at a hotel up the street from the Bowl to make sure they would not miss the performance due to snarled traffic pouring in as showtime neared. Nevertheless, the show went off without a hitch.

In December 1980, Mangione held a benefit concert in the Americana Hotel Ballroom in Rochester, to benefit the victims of an earthquake in Italy. The nine-hour concert included jazz performers Chick Corea, Steve Gadd and Dizzy Gillespie, among a host of other session and concert musicians. Soon thereafter, A&M released Tarantella, named for the Italian traditional dance, a vinyl album of some of the concert's exceptional moments, which has not yet been released as a CD.

A 1980 issue of Current Biography called "Feels So Good" the most recognized tune since "Michelle" by The Beatles. He raised over $50,000 for St. John's Nursing Home at his 60th Birthday Bash Concert at the Eastman Theatre and played a few bars of "Feels So Good". In 1997, Mangione did a session with Les Paul. Mangione was told of how he beat out Paul for the 'Album of the Year' award.

Acting career and television appearances
In addition to music, Mangione has made a few appearances in television shows. In the Magnum, P.I. episode "Paradise Blues", Chuck Mangione portrays a fellow night club act along with TC's (Roger E. Mosley's) former girlfriend. He performed two singles and has lines near the end of the show. In 1988, Mangione appeared on the hit family TV show: Sharon, Lois & Bram's Elephant Show as "Little Boy Blue" playing his famous song.

Mangione had a recurring voice-acting role on the animated television series King of the Hill. In it he portrays himself as a celebrity spokesman for Mega Lo Mart, almost always wearing the white and red jacket from the cover of his Feels So Good album. The first episode of King of the Hill with Mangione originally aired on February 16, 1997. The episode featured an original score specifically recorded for the occasion. He continued to appear in episodes, a total of ten more up until 2003. In the context of the series, Mangione chafes under an oppressive spokesperson contract with Mega Lo Mart (his contract had him appearing at every Mega-Lo store opening, some 400 per year, leaving him no time to tour, record or be with his family). He eventually goes into hiding inside their store in Arlen, Texas, the fictional town in which King of the Hill is set. Mangione is discovered by Dale Gribble, who keeps his secret, in the episode "Mega-Lo Dale." After a long hiatus, the character of Chuck Mangione returned in May 2007 in an episode titled "Lucky's Wedding Suit". A recurring joke is that whatever tune he plays on his flugelhorn inevitably shifts into "Feels So Good" after a few bars;   After the Mega Lo Mart blows up, Mangione states during a group therapy session that "Every song I play now sounds like 'Feels So Good'." The series finale in 2009 included Mangione one last time, playing the National Anthem which segued into "Feels So Good". In an homage to the series, Mangione's album Everything For Love contains a track titled "Peggy Hill".

Mangione's band
Two members of the band, Gerry Niewood and Coleman Mellett, were among those killed when Continental Airlines Flight 3407 crashed into a house in the vicinity of Buffalo, New York, on February 12, 2009. In a statement Mangione said: "I'm in shock over the horrible, heartbreaking tragedy."

Discography

Riverside Records
 The Mangione Brothers Sextet: The Jazz Brothers (Riverside RLP-9335, August 1960; CD reissue: OJC CD-997, 1998)
 The Jazz Brothers: Hey Baby! (Riverside RLP-9371, March 1961; CD reissue: OJC CD-668, 1991)
 The Jazz Brothers: Spring Fever with Sal Nistico (Riverside RLP-9405, November 1961; CD reissue: OJC CD-769, 1993)
 Recuerdo with Joe Romano (Jazzland JLP-984, 1962; CD reissue: OJC CD-495, 1990)
 Jazz Brother (Milestone M-47042, 1977) 2-LP compilation

Mercury Records
 Friends & Love...A Chuck Mangione Concert (Mercury SRM-2-800, 1970) 2-LP
 Together: A New Chuck Mangione Concert (Mercury SRM-2-7501, 1971) 2-LP
 The Chuck Mangione Quartet (Mercury SRM-1-631, 1972)
 Chuck Mangione Quartet: Alive! (Mercury SRM 1-650, 1972)
 Land of Make Believe: A Chuck Mangione Concert (Mercury SRM-1-684, 1973; CD reissue: Mercury/PolyGram 822 539, 1990)
 Encore: The Chuck Mangione Concerts (Mercury SRM-1-1050, 1975) compilation
 The Best of Chuck Mangione (Mercury SRM-2-8601, 1978) 2-LP compilation
 Chuck Mangione: Compact Jazz (Mercury/PolyGram 830 696, 1987) compilation

A&M Records
 Chase the Clouds Away (A&M/PolyGram 214 518, 1975; CD reissue: A&M/PolyGram 213 115, 1987)
 Bellavia [Mangione's mother's maiden name] (A&M/PolyGram 214 557, 1975; CD reissue: A&M/PolyGram 213 172, 1988)
 Main Squeeze (A&M/PolyGram 214 612, 1976; CD reissue: A&M/PolyGram 213 220, 1989)
 Feels So Good (A&M/PolyGram 214 658, 1977; CD reissue: A&M/PolyGram 213 219, 1989)
 Children of Sanchez (A&M/PolyGram 216 700, 1978) 2-LP
 An Evening of Magic, Live at the Hollywood Bowl (A&M/PolyGram 216 701, 1978) 2-LP
 Fun and Games (A&M/PolyGram 213 715, 1980; CD reissue: A&M/PolyGram 213 193, 1988)
 "Cannonball Run" Theme (From the motion picture "Cannonball Run") (A&M/Polygram 2354, 1981) soundtrack
 Tarantella [live] (A&M/PolyGram 216 513, 1981) 2-LP
 70 Miles Young (A&M/PolyGram 214 911, 1982; CD reissue: A&M/PolyGram 213 237, 1989)
 The Best of Chuck Mangione (A&M/PolyGram 213 282, 1985; CD reissue: A&M/PolyGram 213 282, 1987) compilation
 Chuck Mangione: A&M Classics (Vol. 6) (A&M/PolyGram 212 502, 1987) compilation
 Greatest Hits (Backlot Series) (A&M/PolyGram 540 514, 1996) compilation
 Chuck Mangione's Finest Hour (Verve/Universal 490 670, 2000) compilation
 The Best of Chuck Mangione (20th Century Masters/The Millennium Collection) (Chronicles/A&M/Universal 493 385, 2002) compilation
 Chuck Mangione: 5 Original Albums (A&M/Universal [EU] 537 656, 2017) 5-CD set; includes Chase the Clouds Away, Main Squeeze, Feels So Good, Fun and Games, and 70 Miles Young.

Columbia Records
 Love Notes (Columbia FC 38101, 1982)
 Journey to a Rainbow (Columbia FC 38686, 1983)
 Disguise (Columbia FC 39479, 1984)
 Save Tonight for Me (Columbia FC 40254, 1986)
 Eyes of the Veiled Temptress (Columbia FC 40984, 1988)
 The Best of Chuck Mangione (Legacy/Columbia CK 86345, 2004) compilation

Other labels
 Live at the Village Gate (Feels So Good FSC-001, 1989) 2-CD
 The Boys from Rochester with Steve Gadd, Joe Romano, Gap Mangione, Frank Pullara (Feels So Good FSC-9002, 1989) 2-CD 
 Greatest Hits [live] (Feels So Good FSG-9004, 1991)
 The Hat's Back (Chuck Mangione/Gates Music 1001, 1994)
 Together Forever with Steve Gadd (Chuck Mangione/Gates Music 1002, 1994)
 Live at the Village Gate, Vol. 1 (Pro-Arte 001, 1995) reissue
 Live at the Village Gate, Vol. 2 (Pro-Arte 002, 1995) reissue
 The Feeling's Back (Chesky JD-184, 1999)
 Everything for Love (Chesky JD-199, 2000)
 Keep in Sight (Tidal, 2019)

With Art Blakey & The Jazz Messengers
 Buttercorn Lady [live] (Limelight LS-86034, 1966)
 Hold On, I'm Coming (Limelight LS-86038, 1966)

References

External links
 – official site

1940 births
Living people
American jazz flugelhornists
American jazz trumpeters
American male trumpeters
American people of Italian descent
A&M Records artists
Chesky Records artists
Columbia Records artists
Eastman School of Music alumni
Grammy Award winners
The Jazz Messengers members
Musicians from Rochester, New York
Mercury Records artists
Smooth jazz musicians
Jazz musicians from New York (state)
American male jazz musicians
Mangione family